Pristimantis erythropleura is a species of frog in the family Strabomantidae.
It is endemic to Colombia.
Its natural habitats are tropical moist montane forests and heavily degraded former forest.
It is threatened by habitat loss.

References

erythropleura
Endemic fauna of Colombia
Amphibians of Colombia
Amphibians of the Andes
Amphibians described in 1896
Taxonomy articles created by Polbot